Edgeworth is an unincorporated community in Bell County, in the U.S. state of Texas. According to the Handbook of Texas, the community had a population of 20 in 2000. It is located within the Killeen-Temple-Fort Hood metropolitan area.

History
Frank Slovak and his wife opened a general store in the community which they later sold to Otto Gavenda. A post office was established at Edgeworth in 1894 and remained in operation until 1904. In 1896, the community had a Baptist church, a drugstore, a doctor, and a blacksmith shop that was owned by Joe Batla. Ben Bigler built a cotton gin and sold it to Paul Matyastik. Henry Jakubik owned and operated a saloon that closed during the prohibition era. Edgeworth reported a population of 10 in 1933. The community then had two businesses and 60 residents in 1947, but both businesses closed, and the population dropped to 20 from 1964 through 2000. It went down to 15 in 2015 and was deemed a ghost town.

Geography

Education
Today, the community is served by the Rogers Independent School District.

References

Unincorporated communities in Texas
Unincorporated communities in Bell County, Texas